Der Landser (literally private, common soldier) was a German pulp magazine published by Pabel-Moewig and featuring mostly stories in World War II settings. The magazine was founded in 1954 by writer and former Luftwaffe officer  (1921–2002), who worked as its editor-in-chief until 1999. In September 2013 the Bauer Media Group, its last owner, ceased publishing the magazine.

History and profile
The magazine asserted that its war stories were true and that their underlying message was one of peace. In fact many of their stories came with disclaimer reminding the reader of the horrors of war. Critics, however, dismissed such claims as pure lip service to avoid getting indexed by West Germany's Federal Department for Media Harmful to Young Persons which started to index several of their editions in the 1950s.

From its founding, the magazine was criticized for glorifying war and delivering a distorted image of the Wehrmacht and Nazi Germany during World War II. The content of novels was accurate regarding minor technical details, but its descriptions were often not authentic and withheld important contextual information from the reader. Antisemitism, German war crimes, the repressive nature of the German government, and the causes of the war were not mentioned. Germany's leading news magazine Der Spiegel described Der Landser once as the expert journal for the whitewashing of the Wehrmacht ("Fachorgan für die Verklärung der Wehrmacht").

The publisher of the magazine was Pabel Moewig, a subsidiary of Bauer Media Group. In September 2013, Bauer Media Group said it would cease publication of Der Landser following complaints from the Simon Wiesenthal Center. The magazine was closed down on 13 September 2013.

Authors
Franz Kurowski
Paul Carell

See also
Waffen-SS in popular culture
Militaria literature

Notes

Further reading
 Dirk Wilking: "Der Landser" - Wie ein Mann ein Mann wird (pdf). In Wolfram Hülsemann, Michael Kohlstruck (Hrsg):  Mobiles Beratungsteam - Einblicke. Brandenburgische Universitätsdruckerei 2004, p. 61-95 (German)
 Torben Fischer, Matthias N. Lorenz: Lexikon der "Vergangenheitsbewältigung" in Deutschland: Debatten- und Diskursgeschichte des Nationalsozialismus nach 1945. transcript Verlag 2007, pp. 115–117 (German)
 Hagen Fleischer: The Past Beneath the present (pdf). Historein Volume 4 (2003-4), p. 65

External links
 List of Der Landser editions at romanhefte-info.de 

1954 establishments in West Germany
2013 disestablishments in Germany
Bauer Media Group
Defunct magazines published in Germany
German-language magazines
History magazines
Magazines established in 1954
Magazines disestablished in 2013
Pseudohistory
Pulp magazines